The following is a list of the top 10 films chosen annually by the critics of Cahiers du Cinéma, a French film magazine. The magazine started the lists in 1951, but did not publish a list from 1952 to 1953 and from 1969 to 1980.

1950s

No lists from 1952 through 1953.

1960s

No list for 1969.

1970s
No lists for the 1970s.

1980s
No list for 1980.

1990s

2000s

2010s

2020s

Filmmakers with three or more works on the lists 
Jean-Luc Godard - 25
Ingmar Bergman - 14
Éric Rohmer - 12
Philippe Garrel - 11
Manoel de Oliveira - 10
Clint Eastwood - 10
Hong Sang-soo - 9
Martin Scorsese - 9
David Cronenberg - 8
David Lynch - 8
Bruno Dumont - 8
Alain Resnais - 8
Federico Fellini - 7
Alfred Hitchcock - 7
Nanni Moretti - 6
Apichatpong Weerasethakul - 6
Michelangelo Antonioni - 6
Robert Bresson - 6
Luis Buñuel - 6
Abbas Kiarostami - 6
Jacques Rivette - 6
Roberto Rossellini - 6
François Truffaut - 6
André Téchiné - 6
Jean-Marie Straub & Danièle Huillet - 6
Brian De Palma - 5
Hou Hsiao-Hsien - 5
Jerzy Skolimowski - 5
Pedro Almodóvar - 4
Jean-Claude Brisseau - 4
Leos Carax - 4
Coen Brothers - 4
Francis Ford Coppola - 4
Claude Chabrol - 4
Arnaud Desplechin - 4
Abel Ferrara - 4
Alain Guiraudie - 4
Howard Hawks - 4
Jia Zhangke - 4
Jerry Lewis - 4
Patricia Mazuy - 4
Kenji Mizoguchi - 4
Maurice Pialat - 4
Satyajit Ray - 4
Quentin Tarantino - 4
Gus Van Sant - 4
Luchino Visconti - 4
Paul Thomas Anderson - 3
Bong Joon-Ho - 3
Marco Bellocchio - 3
Bernardo Bertolucci - 3
Shohei Imamura - 3
Benoît Jacquot - 3
Akira Kurosawa - 3
Fritz Lang - 3
Joseph L. Mankiewicz - 3
Nicholas Ray - 3
Jean Renoir - 3
Steven Spielberg - 3
M. Night Shyamalan - 3
Lars von Trier - 3
Orson Welles - 3
Kelly Reichardt - 3

See also
 Sight & Sound
 Empire magazine
 The Film Daily annual critics' poll
List of films considered the best

References 

Top film lists
Lists of French films
Film criticism